Sua Betong–Sunggala Highway, Federal Route 219, is a major highway in Port Dickson, Negeri Sembilan, Malaysia. It is also a main route to Seremban–Port Dickson Highway from south. The Kilometre Zero of the Federal Route 219 is located at Teluk Kemang Roundabout.

Features
At most sections, the Federal Route 219 was built under the JKR R5 road standard, allowing maximum speed limit of up to 90 km/h.

List of interchanges

References

Highways in Malaysia
Malaysian Federal Roads